The 1963 World Table Tennis Championships men's doubles was the 27th edition of the men's doubles championship.
Chang Shih-Lin and Wang Chih-Liang won the title after defeating Hsu Yin-Sheng and Chuang Tse-Tung in the final by three sets to nil.

Results

See also
List of World Table Tennis Championships medalists

References

-